Oland Alexander "Dixie" McArthur (February 1, 1892 – May 31, 1986) was a pitcher in Major League Baseball. He played for the Pittsburgh Pirates.

References

External links

1892 births
1986 deaths
Major League Baseball pitchers
Pittsburgh Pirates players
Bethel Wildcats baseball players
Baseball players from Alabama
Hopkinsville Hoppers players
Richmond Colts players
Grand Rapids Black Sox players
People from Vernon, Alabama